The Courier of Moncenisio (Italian:Il vetturale del Moncenisio) is a 1927 Italian silent drama film directed by Baldassarre Negroni and starring Bartolomeo Pagano, Rina De Liguoro and Umberto Casilini. It is an adaptation of the 1852 play Jean le cocher by Joseph Bouchardy.

Cast
 Bartolomeo Pagano as Gian-Claudio Thibaut  
 Rina De Liguoro as Genoveffa  
 Umberto Casilini as Ludovico, conte di Arezzo 
 Alex Bernard as Pietruccio, il campanaro  
 Cellio Bucchi as Il colonello Rouger  
 Giuseppe Brignone as Il parroco di S. Martino  
 Mimi Dovia as Giovanna Thibaut  
 Manlio Mannozzi as Enrico Rouger  
 Oreste Grandi as Morel  
 Carlo Valenzi as Napoleone  
 Felice Minotti
 Andrea Milano

References

Bibliography 
 Moliterno, Gino. The A to Z of Italian Cinema. Scarecrow Press, 2008.

External links 
 

1927 films
1920s historical drama films
Italian silent feature films
Italian historical drama films
Italian films based on plays
1920s Italian-language films
Films directed by Baldassarre Negroni
Remakes of Italian films
Italian black-and-white films
1927 drama films
Silent drama films
1920s Italian films